Vergnaud is a surname. Notable people with the surname include:

Bernadette Vergnaud (born 1950), French politician
Gérard Vergnaud (1933–2021), French mathematician, philosopher, educator, and psychologist